Carl B. Camras (November 23, 1953 – April 14, 2009) was an American ophthalmologist known for his research on the treatment of glaucoma. He discovered a new class of drugs to treat glaucoma—prostaglandin analogues.  Specifically, he developed latanoprost sold under the trade name Xalatan, which is the most widely used glaucoma medication.

Biography
Carl Camras grew up in Chicago, Illinois. He was the son of the engineer and inventor Marvin Camras who held over 550 patents. His father invented magnetic recording which was later used on VCR tapes and computer disks.

Undergraduate work
As a molecular biophysics and biochemistry major at Yale University, Dr. Camras first conceived the idea that low doses of prostaglandins could be effective in lowering intraocular pressure in glaucoma.

Medical school
In medical school at Columbia University, Dr. Camras sought out a research adviser who would work with him on his project. After many rejections, he partnered with a renowned researcher-novelist Dr. László Z. Bitó who agreed to work with him on the project.  Together with the help of Johan Stjernschantz at Pharmacia, the three developed the prostaglandin analogue, latanoprost, which remains the leading treatment in glaucoma therapy.

References

1953 births
2009 deaths
American ophthalmologists
Yale Graduate School of Arts and Sciences alumni
Columbia University Vagelos College of Physicians and Surgeons alumni
University of Nebraska Medical Center faculty
People from Glencoe, Illinois
University of California, Los Angeles alumni